is a railway station in the city of Tamura, Fukushima Prefecture, Fukushima Prefecture, Japan, operated by East Japan Railway Company (JR East).

Lines

Station layout
The station has one island platform connected to the station building by a level crossing. The station is unstaffed.

Platforms

History
Ōgoe Station opened on March 21, 1915. The station was absorbed into the JR East network upon the privatization of the Japanese National Railways (JNR) on April 1, 1987.

Passenger statistics
In fiscal 2015, the station was used by an average of 216 passengers daily (boarding passengers only).

Surrounding area
 Ōgoe Post Office
former Ōgoe Town Hall

References

External links

 

Stations of East Japan Railway Company
Railway stations in Fukushima Prefecture
Ban'etsu East Line
Railway stations in Japan opened in 1915
Tamura, Fukushima